Anthony Smith (born 12 April 1951) is a former Australian rules footballer who played for the Richmond Football Club in the Victorian Football League (VFL).

Notes

External links 
		

Living people
1951 births
Australian rules footballers from Victoria (Australia)
Richmond Football Club players